Placenticeras meeki is an ammonite species from the Late Cretaceous. These cephalopods were fast-moving nektonic carnivores. They mainly lived in the American Interior Basin (Western Interior Seaway).

Description
They are discoidal, involute and compressed. Whorls are stout and rounded to diameter of 3 millimeters. The surface of fossils is usually covered by opalized nacre (ammolite).

Etymology
The name honours Fielding Bradford Meek.

References

 Ammonites
 J.B. Reeside A comparison of the genera Metaplacenticeras Spath and Platcenticeras Meek Professional Paper - United States Geological Survey
Sepkoski, Jack  Sepkoski's Online Genus Database – Cephalopodes

Placenticeratidae
Late Cretaceous ammonites